Crónica Electrónica, also known as Crónica, is an independent media-label based in Porto, Portugal. Founded in 2003 by Miguel Carvalhais, Pedro Tudela, Lia, João Cruz, Paulo Vinhas and Pedro Almeida, it publishes experimental sound and visual artists.
Originally formed around a small group of Portuguese artists, Crónica eventually expanded its roster to include international musicians and sound artists.
Since 2005, Crónica organizes a free annual event in Porto which is "simultaneous the celebration of the label's anniversary, a gathering of friends and lovers of experimental music and an offer to the city" it operates in.

Releases
Although many releases adhere to the standard CD format, among its outputs one can find two main alternative series that try to explore and expand the curatorial role of a music label and the potential of digital distribution.

Unlimited
The Unlimited release series are digital-only releases, available either as free downloads or as commercial editions from online retailers.

Limited
The Limited releases present physical goods which come in diverse formats, ranging from prints to objects or hand-cut vinyls. All of these are numbered and signed by the artist and are available in very limited quantities.

Broadcast

Futurónica
Futurónica was a radio program produced by the label, broadcast fortnightly by Rádio Zero (from 2009 to 2017) and Rádio Manobras (from 2011 to 2017).

Crónicaster
From 2005 to 2016, Crónica published 122 releases of a podcast, Crónicaster, in which were presented label-related pieces, such as radio broadcasts, live performances and remixes.

Recognition
Although the notability in Portugal, beyond a circle of musicians and some attentive followers of the label's activity, is diminished, the European and international panorama is quite different.
It has become a reference in European experimental music and sound art.

Crónica has been praised for being a well curated label.
It was compared to Mego, but the distinction became clear over time; Crónica uses noise without making noise music, and stands on a smaller, more targeted niche.

The label is known for the quality of their releases and their continuous effort to put out high-quality music.
They make choices based on projects rather than musicians
and have shown to make bold choices and have an eye for special music.

Their catalogue has been described as sharp and demanding,

encompassing a diverse genres, such as electro-acoustic music, ambient, minimal music, improvised jazz and field-recordings.

In 2006, Crónica was present at the Sónar Festival in Barcelona. Miguel Carvalhais and Return (João Cruz) performed a set that showcased future releases.

Artists

 @c
 Alessio Ballerini
 Alexander Rishaug
 André Gonçalves
 Angélica Salvi
 Arlene Tucker
 Artificial Memory Trace
 Arturas Bumšteinas
 Attilio Novellino
 Autodigest
 Boca Raton
 Bruno Duplant
 Budhaditya Chattopadhyay
 Cáncer
 Carlos Santos
 Cem Güney
 Christof Migone
 Daniel Bisig
 Dan Powell
 Darius Čiuta
 David Lee Myers
 David Maranha
 Davor Mikan
 Dawn Scarfe
 Durán Vázquez
 Edu Comelles
 Emidio Buchinho
 Emmanuel Mieville
 Enrico Coniglio
 Ephraim Wegner
 Eric La Casa
 Fernando Godoy
 Francisco López
 Freiband
 Gigantiq
 Gilles Aubry
 Gintas K
 Giuseppe Cordaro
 Graeme Truslove
 Guido Flichman
 Guy Dowsett
 Haarvöl
 Heimir Björgúlfsson
 Helgi Thorsson
 Hugo Olim
 Ifs
 Ilia Belorukov
 Isabel Latorre
 James Eck Rippie
 Janek Schaefer
 Jazznoise
 Jim Haynes
 John Grzinich
 Jonas Ohlsson
 Jos Smolders
 Julia Weinmann
 Jura Laiva
 Lawrence English
 Lemures
 Lia
 Longina
 Luca Forcucci
 Lucas Alvarado
 Luís Antero
 Luis Marte
 Mad Disc
 Marc Behrens
 Marius Watz
 Marla Hlady
 Martijn Tellinga
 Máquina Magnética
 Mathias Delplanque
 Matilde Meireles
 Miguel Flor
 Miguel A. García
 Miguel Leal
 Mikel R. Nieto
 Mise_en_scene
 
 Monty Adkins
 Morten Riis
 Mosaique
 Nicolas Bernier
 o.blaat
 Ok.Suitcase
 Oriol Rosell
 Oscar Martin
 Øyvind Brandtsegg
 paL
 Paulo Raposo
 Pawel Grabowski
 Pedro Rebelo
 Pedro Tudela
 Philip Samartzis
 Pimmon
 Piotr Kurek
 Porcje Rosołowe
 Pure
 Quarz
 Ran Slavin
 Return
 Ricardo Guerreiro
 Richard Eigner
 Roel Meelkop
 Rutger Zuydervelt
 Saverio Rosi
 Simon Cummings
 Simon Whetham
 Síria
 Sound Meccano
 Stephan Mathieu
 Stephen Vitiello
 Stefan Nussbaumer
 Sumugan Sivanesan
 Sun Dog
 TAMTAM
 Tarab
 tilia
 The Beautiful Schizophonic
 Trondheim EMP
 TU M’
 Tuulikki Bartosik
 UBERMORGEN.COM
 Ulrich Mitzlaff
 Vacuamoenia
 Vitor Joaquim
 Xoán-Xil López
 Yiorgis Sakellariou

Cover artists

 Alessandro Segalini
 Aki Onda
 Andrea Bolognino
 Andy Fullalove
 Arménio Martins
 C.E.B.Reas
 Christina Vantzou
 Clovis Vallois
 David Lee Myers
 David Muth
 Estelle Chaigne
 Heitor Alvelos
 Helen Cho
 Hugo Olim
 Hugo Oliveira
 Insert Silence (Amit Pitaru & James Paterson)
 Jan Robert Leegte
 Jan Rohlf
 Jewboy Co.
 João Cruz
 José Carneiro
 Julia Weinmann
 Lia
 Marc Behrens
 Mário Moura
 Marius Waltz
 Miguel Leal
 Pedro de Sousa Pereira
 Pedro Tudela
  (Maia Gusberti)
 
 Rosemary Lee
 Rui Vitorino Santos
 Rutger Zuydervelt
 Simon Whetham
 Skurktur
 Stephen Harvey
 Steve Roden
 Tami Wiesel

Catalogue

References

External links
 Official Site
 Digital Berlin label feature
 Crónica concert program at Netwerk Aalst
 Crónica discography on discogs.com

Portuguese independent record labels
Electronic music record labels
Ambient music record labels